Joasaph is a masculine given name. Joasaph is another name for Josaphat, the legendary martyred prince in the story of Barlaam and Josaphat; according to E. A. Wallis Budge, this name Joasaph ultimately originated as a mistranslation of Bodhisattva. The Ethiopic form of the name is Yewasef. People with this name include:

John VI Kantakouzenos (1292–1382), Byzantine emperor from 1347 to 1354, assumed the name Joasaph Christodoulos after his retirement to a monastery
Joasaph I of Constantinople, Ecumenical Patriarch of Constantinople
Joasaphus, Metropolitan of Moscow (died 1556), Metropolitan of Moscow from 1539 to 1542 
Joasaph II of Constantinople, Ecumenical Patriarch of Constantinople
Patriarch Joasaphus I of Moscow (died 1640), Patriarch of Moscow and All Russia from 1634 to 1640
Joasaph of Belgorod (1705–1754), bishop of Belgorod
Joasaph Bolotov (1760–1799), Russian Orthodox missionary in Alaska
Ioasaf Tikhomirov (1872–1908), Russian actor
Joasaph Leliukhin (1903–1966),  Metropolitan of Kiev and Galicia and Exarch of Ukraine
Joasaph (McLellan) (1962–2009), Head of the Russian Ecclesiastical Mission in Jerusalem of the Russian Orthodox Church Outside Russia

See also
Josaphat (disambiguation)

References